The Frauenthal House is a historic house in Little Rock, Arkansas.  It is a two-story stuccoed structure, three bays wide, with a terra cotta hip roof.  Its front entry is sheltered by a Colonial Revival portico, supported by fluted Doric columns and topped by an iron railing.  The entrance has a half-glass door and is flanked by sidelight windows.  It was designed in 1919 by Thompson & Harding and built for Charles Frauenthal.

The house was listed on the U.S. National Register of Historic Places (NRHP) in 1982.

See also
Frauenthal House (Conway, Arkansas), another Thompson design
National Register of Historic Places listings in Little Rock, Arkansas

References

Houses on the National Register of Historic Places in Arkansas
Colonial Revival architecture in Arkansas
Houses completed in 1919
Houses in Little Rock, Arkansas
National Register of Historic Places in Little Rock, Arkansas